The Berserk manga and anime series features a cast of characters created by Kentaro Miura. The series takes place in a dark fantasy setting loosely based on medieval Europe. Berserk centers on the life of Guts, a lone mercenary warrior, and Griffith, the leader of a mercenary band called the  who made a pact with demons and is reborn as one himself.

Principal characters

Guts

 is a mercenary who travels from company to company so he is always fighting. After meeting Griffith, Guts is defeated in battle by Griffith and is forced to join the Band of the Hawk. Guts has also appeared in every Berserk video game. Guts is a Byronic hero who is born as one who may be able to struggle against causality, but who is unable to maintain it indefinitely. His childhood and adolescence is defined by his growing up in a mercenary band after being adopted by a motherly prostitute named Shisu and later the band's leader Gambino, and his later joining of, and departure from, the Band of the Hawk.

The dynamic and turbulent relationship between Guts and Griffith, the leader of the Band of the Hawk, forms the primary focus of the manga for the first thirteen volumes. After the events of the Eclipse, during which he loses his left forearm and right eye, Guts seeks revenge on Griffith, who is now Femto. In the process, he is reunited with Casca after a separation of two years. Following the Incarnation Ceremony at Albion, Guts travels with a new group of companions.

Guts can be seen as the exact opposite of Griffith in just about every way. In appearance, he is a tall, muscular warrior with short black hair, a body full of scars and wields a monstrous weapon while dressed in cursed armor, whereas the latter is of average height, thin, has long white hair, no physical scars and wields a delicate sabre. Guts wears tattered black clothing and, though incredibly skilled, fights like a barbarian; winning by any means necessary. Griffith wears white armor and has a much more refined style resembling fencing. In addition they usually have the exact opposite effect on everyone they meet. Most people are naturally drawn to Griffith upon first meeting him and would die for him without hesitation whereas Guts is usually feared and detested by just about everyone he comes across until they get to know him, after which he will usually end up being revered as a hero by those same people. This extends to their morals and actions as well. Guts maintains the image of a callous warrior who manages to protect the people around him while Griffith puts up a somewhat idealistic facade but is also willing to sacrifice anybody without exception to further his ultimate goal. And while Guts unhesitatingly chooses to battle his way through enemies, Griffith refrains from excessive participation in combat, preferring to manipulate anyone in his way.

Griffith

 is originally the founding leader of the mercenary unit known as the Band of the Hawk, both the group and his title "White Hawk" named for his helmet forged in the shape of a Hawk's head. Extraordinarily charismatic, intelligent, handsome, and ambitious, Griffith's skill with his sabre and tactics gave him and his band a reputation of invincibility, making him the favored choice of the Midland King, who was locked in a century long war with the Empire of Tudor. Believing that he is destined for greater things, Griffith is willing to sacrifice everything for the dream of his own kingdom and only values others who are of use to him. The source of his ambition is a Crimson Behelit given to him by a fortune teller who claims it to be an "Egg of the King" that would lead an average person to become a great ruler.
 
The only two people Griffith truly trusted were Guts and Casca, who were his confidants in private moments. There are several hints in the series that Griffith has feelings for Guts, expressing an obsessive want for the swordsman's strength as he bested him in a duel to force his servitude. When the Hundred Year War ended, Griffith learned of Guts's intention to leave the Band of the Hawk and resolves to kill his friend if he cannot keep him by his side. But Guts instantly defeats Griffith in their second duel by breaking his sabre, leaving Griffith in disbelief with his morale crushed. Later that night, Griffith coldly seduces Princess Charlotte and is later discovered, leading to his imprisonment and torture by the Midland King who labels his group wanted criminals. A year later, now a broken and hateful shell of his former self, Griffith is rescued by Casca, Guts, Judeau, and Pippin. After Wyald's attack and the further realization of his current state from a year of crippling torture, Griffith triggered the Crimson Behelit in an act of desperation. Griffith and the Hawks are drawn into an Interstice known as the Nexus where the God Hand offer him a position among them if he sacrifices his followers to the apostles that have gathered for the Eclipse. With Ubik's powers convincing him that a few more deaths will not matter as long as he fulfills his dream, Griffith agrees to the God Hand's terms and transcends into an incorporeal demon in dark hawk armor with cape-like wings. Rechristened , no longer bound by human ties and seeing the destiny laid before him by the Idea of Evil, Griffith rapes Casca as an act of malevolence towards Guts. Two years later, Griffith is brought back to the physical plane after The Egg of the Perfect World orchestrated the millennial Incarnation Ceremony at Albion, using the body of Casca's malformed child as a vessel with Griffith’s mind subverted during the night of a full moon. Griffith creates a new Band of the Hawk composed of Apostles and humans that are drawn to him as the original Hawks were, making himself the sole military leader of Midland's armies. Griffith also wins the loyalty of the Holy See, with its pontiff regarding him as the Hawk of Light incarnate and willing to oversee his marriage to Charlotte. After leading the defeat of the Kushan Empire, using Ganishka's death to establish a worldwide interstice, Griffith establishes the city of Falconia as both a haven for remaining humans and as capital of a new Midland Empire. Despite Falconia's utopian appearance, it has a strong totalitarian undercurrents from Griffith establishing himself as the unquestionable ruler of Midland with any detractors either executed by the Holy See on heresy charges or being secretly murdered by Rakshas.

As Femto, Griffith is capable of flight via his wings and, like other members of the God Hand, can perceive the flow of causality, and manipulate matter and distort space.

Casca

 was the only female member in the original Band of the Hawk and is behind only Griffith and Guts in swordsmanship. Her ambivalent relationship to both of them makes her moody and capricious. Casca joins the Hawks after Griffith empowers her to save herself from a sexual assault by a nobleman who bought her from her parents, and since that time harbors feelings towards Griffith which most of their comrades are aware of. While Casca was against Guts joining the Hawks, her hostility towards him gradually waned as she came to accept him as a comrade for saving her life multiple times while developing feelings for him. When Guts is preparing to leave the band, Casca attempts to convince him to stay, but to no avail. After Griffith is imprisoned, Casca becomes the leader of the Band of the Hawk, as they are forced to go into hiding, having been branded as outlaws by Midland. After Guts returns to aid them when they are under attack, Casca falsely blames Guts for Griffith's capture and then laments her perceived failures as a leader before attempting suicide. Guts saves her yet again and the two finally consummate their mutual feelings for one another, embarking on a rescue mission to recover Griffith the following day.

The rescue of Griffith is successful, but his broken spirit leads him to sacrifice the Hawks during the Eclipse. Casca is forced to watch their comrades being slaughtered before being violated by Griffith after his rebirth as Femto. The ordeal emotionally scarred Casca; her mind broke and mentally regressed to a childlike state while losing all her memories as a self-defense measure from the trauma. In addition to being branded with a sacrificial mark on her breast and thus becoming a target for fell creatures on a nightly basis, Casca prematurely gives birth to her child with Guts after it has been corrupted from Griffith's rape. Casca was entrusted to Godo's care. But Casca wandered off to St. Albion two years later, saved from Holy See fanatics by Guts as he attempts to protect her on his own despite the more dangerous spirits attracted by their brands in close proximity. Guts's attempt to protect Casca ultimately resulted in losing her trust when he attacked her while under the influence of his inner darkness. As Casca travels, completely oblivious to her surroundings, Guts and company keep a close watch over her. She has put herself in grave danger many times but Guts' group has yet to fail to come to her rescue and protect her. She seems to slowly be warming up to Guts again even coming to his side when he is unconscious to watch him. Casca's well-being is the driving force for Guts to keep himself from reverting to a revenge-obsessed wanderer. While outside Vritanis, the Skull Knight revealed that her mental state may be cured by the Elvish queen Hanafuku while cryptically warning Guts that "What [Casca] wishes for may not be what [Guts] wish[es] for". When Farnese and Schierke enter the world within Casca's mind as part of Hanafuku's ritual once they reach Elfhelm, the two realize that Casca did not want her mind restored as it would mean dealing with the pain from her ordeal in the Eclipse. But the two restore Casca anyway, with Farnese promising to help her cope with her pain. But Casca, still reluctant to be near Guts due to her traumatic ordeal, is abducted by Griffith.

The Band of the Hawk
The original Band of the Hawk during the Golden Age arc was a group of mercenaries led by Griffith, who achieved great exploits on the battlefield during the hundred-year war. But after Griffith was rescued by his imprisonment, broken and mutilated from the year-long torture, the Hawks were offered up by their leader for the Eclipse ritual. Guts, Casca, and Rickert, the only members of the group not to be taken into the Nexus, are the sole survivors while the rest were all devoured and slaughtered by the gathered Apostles while Griffith used their souls to be reborn as Femto.

Judeau

 was part of the original Band of the Hawk and was a former circus performer with a skill in knife-throwing. He was one of Griffith's best fighters, but perhaps his greatest strength came from his ability to read the emotions of others, as shown when he was the first to notice the growing bond between Guts and Casca, before either of them realized it themselves. Patient, calm, and practical, Judeau was often the voice of reason when dealing with more volatile individuals like Corkus. With his easygoing and optimistic personality, he often put the interests of his companions in the band before his own, and showed himself to be at ease with understanding matters of the heart and surmising the true intentions of those around him. Judeau himself admitted that he was pretty good at a lot of things but was not a stand-out in any of them. Throughout his tenure with the Band of the Hawk, he was also secretly in love with Casca, but never acted on it out of respect for Guts' and Casca's feelings for each other. During the Eclipse, still seeing her as their leader, Judeau attempted to help Casca escape and is killed while trying to protect her from the Apostles.

Pippin

 was a massive man who wielded an equally massive mace. A former miner who lent his strength to the Band of the Hawk, his finely attuned senses, fast reactions and raw strength saved the skins of the group on many occasions, particularly when he was the first to sense the impending ambush from the Army of Midland following Griffith's capture. In spite of his intimidating physique, he had an even-tempered demeanor, shown when he kept his cool dragging a defiant Guts to the festivities, even after the latter hit him and made him bleed. Pippin was a man of few words, which, along with his appearance, might have led others to wrongly doubt his intelligence. He was often found with Rickert, with whom he seemed to share a big-brotherly relationship. During the Eclipse, he held off an Apostle to buy time for Casca and Judeau to escape. Pippin's hollowed out, lifeless corpse was seen by Guts one last time before the Count ripped the husk in half.

Corkus

 was a loud-mouthed man with delusions of grandeur, and a former bandit leader before he joined the Band of the Hawk. He was the one who first tried to assault Guts in order to rob him of the money earned defeating Bazuso, but failed miserably, forcing Casca, and eventually Griffith, to intervene. Since then, Corkus held a grudge against Guts and never fully accepted him as a Hawk. Surprisingly, when Casca and Rickert blamed Guts for Griffith's capture, Corkus refused to agree with them due to his belief that they overestimated Guts' importance to the Band. Despite his outspoken attitude, he was one of the most loyal members in the Band of the Hawk. During the Eclipse, while fleeing for his life amidst the slaughter, Corkus went into denial from shock at his hellish surroundings, before being killed by a nameless female apostle who swallowed his head. Guts would later avenge Corkus when he crossed paths with the apostle at the start of the Black Swordsman arc, pretending to have fallen into her sexual trap.

Rickert

 was the youngest member of the original Band of the Hawk and is one of its few surviving members, as he was not present at Griffith's rescue and the Eclipse event that followed. In the aftermath, left in the dark as to what truly happened, Rickert became an apprentice of the blacksmith Godo over the next two years while forging a sword in memory of his fallen comrades to serve as grave markers on a hill that is later called "The Hill of Swords". It is Rickert who tweaks Guts' armor and replaces his old crossbow with a repeating crossbow. When Guts confronts Griffith at the Hill of Swords, Rickert finally learns how the latter's act condemned Judeau, Pippin, and Corkus to horrible deaths while leaving Guts maimed and Casca mute and traumatized. In spite of this, Griffith offers Rickert a position in the new Band of the Hawk. After the death of Godo and the destruction of his mine by Zodd, Rickert travels with Godo's adopted granddaughter Erica to Falconia. There, despite recognizing Griffith's generosity and seeing the good he has been doing for the people, Rickert is unable to forgive him and declines his offer to join the New Band of the Hawk, telling him that the Griffith he once followed is dead. He is then attacked by Rakshas on the orders of either Griffith or Locus, though he is saved by the timely arrival of Silat and his bodyguards. In the anime, possibly due to English errors, Rickert's name is given as "Ricket", lacking the "R", and is addressed as such in the show.

Gaston

 was the second in command of Gut's raiders in the Band of the Hawk. He was usually seen by the side of Guts whom he showed deep respect for, both as a commanding officer and friend. During the battle for a Tudor stronghold, Gaston attempted to hold back Guts due to the immense power of Zodd, resulting in Guts threatening to kill Gaston. Despite this, Gaston was the first to aid Guts after his defeat by Zodd. Gaston would eventually leave the Band of the Hawk soon after the battle for Doldrey to pursue his dream of opening a clothing shop in Wyndham using the earnings he saved up as a mercenary. He would later abandon his store to rejoin the band when word got around of their exile, revealing to Guts that it was his obligation to return as the raiders were family to him. Just before the Eclipse, he and the other raiders requested to join Guts in his travels across the land now that the band is not in a state to continue as it once was. During the Eclipse he is the last member of the band to die having been found by Guts in a severely injured state before a demon bursts from within his skull, killing him instantly. In the film trilogy, his demise is instead shown off-screen with a traumatized Guts finding what remains of his corpse.

Guts' Party

Puck

 is a Wind spirit from Elfhelm, a utopia on Skellig Island in the Western Sea. Elves in Berserk can only be seen by the open-minded; the devoutly religious cannot see Puck at all, though he can play with their face unbeknownst to them. Puck can secrete a powder from his wings to quickly heal wounds and can emit a bright flash to blind enemies. On occasion, he also resorts to his "Bloody Needle" attack, tossing a chestnut at someone. It deals no injury, but is painful enough to prompt most victims to cry out. Puck was the first to join Guts' journey, and is starting to show a strange attachment to the Behelit Guts took upon his battle with the Count.

Puck initially served as a good-natured foil to Guts during his early Black Swordsman days, but has since then been relegated to comic relief. He is often drawn in an exaggerated manner alongside Isidro in these situations, and has also developed a playful brother-sister relationship with the female elf Ivalera, who is the newest comic relief character.

Farnese de Vandimion
, Erica Lindbeck (English, 2016 anime)

 is a noblewoman who led the Holy See's ceremonial guard, the Holy Iron Chain Knights. Since this position has been traditionally held by a woman, Farnese was appointed during her stay at the convent she was sent to by her father, Federico de Vandimion. A bit of a pyromaniac (and possibly a pyrophiliac), Farnese's habit of impulsively burning things she did not like, along with her unstable mentality from her poor upbringing, provoked her to hunt down and burn supposed witches and pagans at the stake. This brought about a secret sadistic pleasure that she constantly tried to deny. She and Serpico left their Holy See positions after her faith was shattered during the devastation of Albion and the events surrounding Griffith's reincarnation. She then chose to follow Guts in hopes of learning more about the world and has changed into a more gentle human being. Since then, Farnese has begun to study witchcraft under Schierke's tutelage. Farnese also seems to have developed a crush on Guts, though she is primarily Casca's care taker and thus rarely involves herself in battles. While given a chainmail of silver and a silver short sword for protection against creatures from the astral plane, Farnese later receives a ring that allows her to manipulate a trio of snake-like rose vines and being taught by Schierke to use magic.

Serpico
, Max Mittelman (English, 2016 anime)

 is Farnese's companion and unbeknownst to her, her paternal half-brother.  During his time with the Holy See, Serpico was Herald for the Holy Iron Chain Knights. When aggressive, Serpico belies his meek appearance and is comparable to a fox due to his shrewd observation and speed with a rapier. Despite Farnese's childhood abuse and her forcing him to burn his own mother at the stake, he cares deeply for his half-sister. Serpico was her servant since she found him beaten on a snowy street over a decade ago. Serpico's relationship with Guts has forever been plagued with animosity, due in large part to the dangers that inevitably surround Guts and anyone he takes into his Band. After a duel with Guts in the underground pillars of Vritannis, Guts spared his life. Their bond rekindled, and Serpico has since learned to trust Guts to protect her when he can not. Serpico uses two items blessed by the wind spirit Sylph in order to battle with tolerance alongside Guts: a rapier that can generate razor sharp gusts of wind; and a cloak that constantly generates a swirling vortex around its wearer which can deflect projectiles, assist in jumping, and slow falls from great heights.

Isidro
, Erik Scott Kimerer (English, 2016 anime)

A young runaway and petty thief,  left home and family behind in order to become a swordsman. After Guts saves him from an attack of Kushan Bakirakas, he follows him around "to spy out his technique".
Although Isidro greatly lacks in swordsman skills, he is an exceptional thrower, managing to kill two pigeons with a double-handed throw at great distance. It is suggested that he has underlying issues regarding his parents, when they are inquired about he becomes more stiff, defensive, and belligerent; or avoids the topic completely. What these issues are, have yet to be revealed. He later receives from Flora the Salamander Dagger, a weapon blessed by the spirits of fire which sears whatever it cuts and also receives an inherited cutlass from an old villager as a gift. He often bickers with Schierke who finds him reckless and ill-mannered.

Schierke
, Mela Lee (English, 2016 anime)

 (Pronounced as Shear-keh) is a good-hearted young witch-in-training, and a disciple of the witch Flora. She is accompanied by an elf, Ivalera. She aided Guts's group with a troll infestation in the nearby village Enoch, where she showed how powerful magic can be in Berserk. After a series of events, Schierke was forced to leave her home and Flora behind forever when they faced an attack Griffith ordered. Schierke, having lived a sheltered life, does not like the Human world or the Holy See's religion, but she finds life outside bearable due to her companions. Her magic skills and knowledge of the world are impressive for a child her age. One of her most used and handiest spells is the ability to hypnotize or temporarily desensitize others. But due to her pivotal role in battles, she is sometimes forced to take risks and try unstable spells. Her ability to sense "Od" (life force or spirit energy) means she can sense the power, intent, and alignment of all creatures and artifacts.

As she sees Isidro as an incompetent monkey, there is some friction between the two, which frequently lends itself to comic situations. Though she initially could not stand Guts, Schierke has developed a slight infatuation with him and both now share a sort of ersatz father-daughter relationship. When Sonia gave her an offer to join the Band of the Hawk, Schierke thought of Guts before declining. Schierke also has the ability to astral project and uses it to help Guts maintain his sanity while using the power of the Berserker Armor, the initial use moving her to tears from seeing a bit of the horror Guts suffered during the Eclipse.

Ivalera
, Tara Sands (English, 2016 anime)

 is an elf who was tasked by Flora to oversee Schierke. She often provides critical information about Schierke's state to the other members of Guts' party while the former is in a spell trance. Like Puck she has been relegated to a comic relief character, often teasing Farnese about her low self-esteem and poking fun at Schierke regarding her infatuation with Guts. She bickers frequently with Puck whom she shares an odd brother-sister relationship with.

Manifico de Vandimion

 is the son of Federico and the brother of Farnese. Federico considers his other sons to be more competent than Manifico, and he has given Manifico the less important family duties as a result. Manifico arranged a marriage between Farnese and his friend Roderick in the hope of improving his standing. When Guts left for Elfhelm, Manifico accompanied him on board Roderick's ship with the intent to capture and breed the elves for commercial purposes. Manifico persuaded Puck to help him by offering him the crown of Elfhelm after Roderick refused to help him, his scheme later exposed and forced to do community service in Elfhelm.

Azan

 is a former member of the Holy Iron Chain Knights who served as Farnese's second-in-command. He was named to this position because Farnese was not considered to be sufficiently experienced to lead without supervision. Azan appeared as a round, bald and bearded middle-aged man who conformed to the old-fashioned rules of a knight. Although possessing a hardened demeanor, he still managed to question the Holy See's appalling methods of dealing with supposed heretics. Effectively wielding a metal quarterstaff, he has shown great skill with it in combat against Guts and various other abnormally skilled or strong fighters. He also follows an uncompromising code of "honor", as seen when his fellow Holy Iron Chain Knights wanted to take revenge on an incapacitated Guts for killing their comrades, where Azan forbids them, stating that he was justified in the context of battle and their poor sword-fighting skills were instead a disgrace.

Guts reveals upon their first encounter some information of Azan's former life. He earned his nickname 'The Bridge Knight' (as well as the decidedly less-savory 'Iron Staff Demon Azan') after he came across an old man defending a small bridge, harassed by bandits. He fought the bandits for hours, laughing all the while, only stopping once they retreated. This feat earned him a reputation comparable to that which Guts earned by slaying one hundred of Adon's mercenaries, but Azan had given up that title, along with his formal knighthood, when he joined the Holy Iron Chain Knights.

At Albion, Azan fought alongside the surviving knights to try and hold off the hordes of crazed cultists and flesh-consuming blobs, and survived only because falling debris from the crumbling tower knocked him unconscious and buried him. He ended up going his own separate ways from then on, but later re-emerged in Vritanis where it was brought up that he was expelled from his Order (and possibly excommunicated) because of the disastrous events that took place at Albion. Presently, he accompanies Guts and company on their sea voyage, earning his spot on board by swabbing the deck, and taking some time off to train young Isidro in the ways of combat.

Roderick of Schtauffen

 is the third prince of the island nation Iith, and captain of the Sea Horse. He is in a similar situation to his college friend Manifico de Vandimion in the sense that he does not get the respect he feels he deserves from his peers. As a sailor, he sees vast potential in the exploration of the seas, unlike his peers, who focus internally to the point of stagnation. As part of Manifico's plan to join the Vandimion name with the royal Iith family, Roderick agreed to be Farnese's fiancé. His obvious motivations for this arranged marriage are the vast opportunities and support the Vandimion name could bring him, but he seems to take a personal interest in the heiress as well due to her reputation. Roderick, with his long black ponytail, his good looks, and free-flowing attitude, is a superb charmer and a decent blade, and demonstrates a willingness to brave demons, even though he is ill-equipped to take them on. He is currently ferrying Guts and company aboard his ship, on their way to Skellig.

Roderick and the crew of the Sea Horse also have a claim to fame on the high seas as their ship sank five Tudor vessels on its own, thus earning Roderick the title of "Prince of the Seas".

Isma
Isma a teenage girl living a solitary existence as a fisherman on a small and remote island. Although she is kind, cheerful, and energetic, she was a pariah on her island home. Her father was a human fisherman who fell in love with a merrow woman who returned to the sea just after Isma's birth, though she left a magical charm on the house to protect her daughter. Though Isma's father raised her by himself before he died when his boat capsized during a storm on sea, Isma was ostracized by the people who feared her status as the child of a merrow would invoke the Sea God's wrath. But this made Isma, who appeared human, curious of her maternal heritage and if merrows do exist. Because of this, protected from the Sea God by her mother's magic, Isma was glad to have confirmation when she meets Guts's group when they came to the island. When Isma attempts to help Guts and his group against the Sea God as it begins attacking the remaining humans on the Island, Isma learns her true name and gains the ability to assume merrow form while reunited with her mother. Once the Sea God is killed, her home destroyed In the process, Isma joins Guts's group aboard the Seahorse on their voyage to Elfhelm.

Antagonists

The God Hand
A group of powerful entities who manipulate the world of Berserk, messengers of the Idea of Evil (an ancient being spawned from humanity's collective desire for a great evil on which they can blame their misfortune) who appear before those who activated a Behelit. In a two hundred and sixteen-year cycle, a ritual known as the Eclipse occurs with a new member recruited, as was the case with Griffith, with a mass sacrificial offering. Unlike the Apostles who serve them, the members of the God Hand can not take a true corporeal form in the mortal plane and are forced to use rudimentary bodies for brief moments. But this can be remedied through an Incarnation Ceremony that occurs once in a millennium with the one who invoked it offering his body as a permanent vessel for a God Hand member to manifest, after offering a large amount of lives. When Griffith is successfully reconstituted in the aftermath of Albion's destruction, the rest of the God Hand were scattered across the Astral Plane. In chapter 306, the rest of the God Hand incarnate in the aftermath of Griffith using Ganishka's defeat to remove the barriers between the mortal and astral planes.

Void

 is the leader of the God Hand with a large, exposed brain, eyes stitched shut and lips peeled back. He is the most philosophical God Hand member and is primarily concerned with analyzing and controlling the course of destiny. Void is the one who brands the sacrifices made by tortured souls in order for them to become apostles and achieve their dream. His cloak and body seem to be distorted and he has the power to open up a sort of interdimensional mirror portal at his own will. Also notable, he has six fingers on each hand. Being the oldest of the God Hand, Void has a history with the Skull Knight tied to the legend of how the first Midland empire ended. Though it is yet to be revealed who Void and the Skull Knight were at the time, the legends said that a holy man who was imprisoned in the Tower of Conviction prayed to god to send his angels to punish Gaiseric.

Slan

The sole female member of the God Hand, also called Whore Princess of the Uterine Sea by Skull Knight, takes on the form of a naked woman with black leathery wings and vine-like hair. She is a sadomasochist who thrives on cruelty and the effect it has on those who observe it. Like the other God Hand, she manipulates humanity through a pagan cult under the moniker "The Goddess of Blazes". She appears to have a fascination with Guts since Griffith's induction, her interest in him growing since his victory over the Count and upon the two meeting, revealed her desire to make him her sex slave. After the Incarnation Ritual to give Griffith physical form ran its course, Slan is separated from the other senior God Hand and acts on her own by manifesting the Qliphoth in a forest and creating a temporary body from troll guts to lure Guts to her so, knowing he could not join the God Hand, she can tempt him to use the behelit he stole from the Count. But the Skull Knight's interference allows Guts to defeat Slan with his Dragonslayer, though she enjoyed the pain and gave Guts a kiss before taking her leave.

Ubik

The God Hand  has the form of a small floating demon wearing glasses and having tentacle-like legs. Always with an evil grin, Ubik appears to be a deceiver; he is able to persuade potential Apostles to fulfill the ritual of sacrifice by conjuring either images of their past or, in Griffith's case, a reflection of their subconscious. While not an outright liar, Ubik twists the truth to place his target in a despondent state of him while convincing them that they have no choice but to make the sacrifice.

Conrad

 is concerned with inevitability and doom and appears as a puckered human face with the body of a massive wood louse. He summoned the mound that lifted Griffith skyward, above the rest of the Hawks. Compared to the rest of the God Hand, Conrad is a stoic individual whose only desire is to spread pestilence to the mortal world, having partially manifesting in diseased rats to orchestrate a Black Plague to force the survivors to flee to St. Albion to be offered for the Incarnation Ritual.

The New Band of the Hawk
After returning to the physical plane, Griffith establishes a new Band of the Hawks using both humans and apostles.

Zodd

 (sometimes known as Zodd the Immortal) is a bloodthirsty apostle who has lived for three centuries slaughtering his way through countless battles in search of worthy opponents. He has the ability to transform from his bestial human form into a Baphomet-like beast with the face and tail of a tiger along with a pair of bat-like wings that he can retract and grow at will. Zodd first encountered and defeated Guts and Griffith during a castle raid, ultimately deciding to spare them upon realizing Griffith's Crimson Behelit and what fate was in store for the Band of the Hawk. He has also had a long-standing rivalry with the Skull Knight, along with Guts as he increasingly became a more capable opponent - this went to the extent of throwing his sword to Guts when Guts' own was destroyed in a duel with General Boscogn of Tudor's Purple Rhino Knights. Zodd was further impressed by Guts when, while serving to guard the way to the Nexus from the Skull Knight, he found the swordsman survived the Eclipse and learns of Guts's exploits. Years later, prior to the Incarnation Ritual in St. Albion, Zodd is defeated within a dream by Griffith which cost him his left horn. Zodd eventually arrives to what remained of Albion to spirit the reconstituted Griffith, becoming his right-hand man and first member of his new Band of the Hawk.

Grunbeld
 (Sword of the Berserk), Kiyoyuki Yanada (2016 anime)

As a member of the reformed Band of the Hawk, his physical built and brute strength make him a replacement of Pippin in retrospect. As revealed in the spin-off novel , Grunbeld was born on the northern island nation of Grant where he befriended princess Benedikte, who saw him an incarnation of a dragon from their folklore. Grunbeld and other children captured by Tudor forces to be raised under their doctrine alongside his new friends Edvard and Sigur, Grunbeld refusing to submit despite embracing Tudor's philosophies as he and the surviving children were freed and enlist in Grant's military. Years later, Grunbeld leads his Flame Dragon Knights to drive off the Tudor invaders before being betrayed by Edvard as he and his father count Haakon are working with the Tudor general Abecassis, arriving too late to find Benedikte and Sigur barely alive and his surviving forces defecting to Tudor. Grunbeld held his ground against three thousand Tudor soldiers before his beherit reacts to his despair-driven desire to forget his grief. Grunbeld accepts the Godhand's offer to reborn an Apostle to destroy his enemies and continue fighting, having Benedikte and Sigur's consent to be his sacrificial offerings with the former telling Grunbeld to find Griffith. Grunbeld then destroyed all of Tudor's remaining strongholds on Grant, becoming a legendary figure in the Hundred Year War with his story lost to history.

Despite being an Apostle, Grunbeld retains his code of honor as he considering Flora's death demeaning despite Grunbeld expressed an interest in fighting Guts when Flora's manor was set inflamed. A disappointed Grunbeld easily defeated Guts, who had yet to recover from his ordeal with Slan at the time, but is then forced to assume his Apostle form after Guts became possessed by the Berserker Armor. In this form, Grunbeld is a quadruped dragon whose outer shell is composed of stylized corundum crystal formations harder than steel and is able to exhale flames from his mouth. Grunbeld is ultimately held back from pursuing Guts and his group by Flora's spirit possessing the flames, returning to Griffith's side to aid in defeating the Kushan army.

Locus

Voiced by: Shougo Nakamura (Japanese, 2016 anime)

, known as the Moonlight Knight, is another of Griffith's new generals in the Hawks. He is undefeated in jousting and was too proud to serve anyone until he swore loyalty to Griffith, who was the object of a vision he experienced. In addition to being an apostle, he also leads the Band of the Hawk's demon lancer division. Along with Irvine, however, he seems to retain the most humanity among the Apostle Army. His Apostle form merges him with his horse to form a metallic centaur, and his lance is transformed into a very long double-ended spear.

Honorable and daring in battle, he could be something of a reversed counterpart to Corkus, as it can also be suggested by the inversion of the first syllabe in their names (with "l" and "r" being the same in Japanese).

Irvine
Voiced by:

 is a prominent archer in the new Band of the Hawks. He has spoken with few people aside from Sonia. His eyes have neither pupils nor irises. His monstrously shaped bow has a demonic eye in the middle of its handguard. As a self-described hunter and loner, he prefers to camp out in the woods whilst immersing himself in his only known pleasure: playing the lute by the campfire. Irvine's precision with the bow is peerless. He is able to fire off several arrows simultaneously with unerring accuracy. The bow itself seems to funnel quite a bit of power into its arrows: foes hit at the neck are usually decapitated. In his Apostle form his legs are replaced by a large wolf creature with horns and the same demonic eye as his bow and his body is now covered in fur and his face looks similar to that of a werewolf. In this new form he is able to remove and twist his tail hairs into arrows and his horns can be used as a crossbow with string made from the horns. Once these arrows from his tail pierce the target they suddenly grow unusually large spikes with the shape of a root that perforate the target's body completely. He shares a bond with Sonia, who has taken to riding him as a mount during the final battle with Ganishka.

With his calm demeanor and affinity for ranged weapons, he could be considered the counterpart of Judeau.

Rakshas

Voiced by: Masashi Nogawa (Japanese, 2016 anime)

 is a devious leader within the new Band of the Hawk, with a history as an exiled member of the Kushan Empire's Bākiraka Clan. Being amorphous, his entire body appearing to shrouded in a black cloak with nearly featureless face concealed by a white mask with three illustrated eyes, Rakshas uses his skills as an assassin to blend into the shadows and produce string-like extensions to stab his enemies. Although he was the one who exposed Silat to Ganishka's horrific process for breeding demon soldiers, his motivations were less than benevolent. He has also admitted that he only joined Griffith's cause in the interest of making sure no one other than himself would kill him. Rakshas later makes an attempt on Rickert's life in Falconia and ends up facing Silat when he comes to youth's aid, replacing his mask after it was damaged with his near-featureless face having only three eyes and a slight nose protrusion. In his Apostle form, he becomes larger and more monstrous, his tentacles gaining more dexterity, but otherwise looks similar to his 'human' self. Rakshas's only weakness is that he can harmed by fire, Rickert using that to his advantage as he, Silat, and their group flee Falconia.

Sonia

Voiced by: Yoshino Nanjō (Japanese, 2016 anime)

 is part of Griffith's reformed Band of the Hawk and is very devout in her admiration of him. Her parents were killed when the Kushans came to her village. She was held prisoner by them until Griffith, with his apostles, rescued her and others in an assault against the invading Kushans forces. Sonia, despite being surrounded in a surreal and sometimes horrific world, remains abnormally laid-back, showing no signs of fear for her life. As a matter of fact, she is amazed and cheerful about the situation in the Hawks. She has the power of clairvoyance, which is amplified when she is near Griffith, with whom she has a childish infatuation and, because of this, is very jealous of Charlotte for being betrothed to Griffith. Sonia uses her ability to sense people's emotions and see visions of the future to aid in the new Band of the Hawk's campaigns. She befriended Schierke when they met in Vritanis and foresees they'll meet again: referring to Schierke as an owl and herself a kite playing in a moonlight forest. She also formed a connection with the distant Irvine.

Recently, when the human followers of Griffith refused to join Griffith's apostles in battle, Sonia charged heedlessly into battle and was saved only by the timely intervention of Irvine. Her bold deed rallied the others, and she now rides Irvine as a mount. After the establishment of Falconia, Griffith places Sonia in the church hierarchy as the new Pope.

Sonia could be seen as a counterpart to Casca: both have been rescued by Griffith, and both have had crushes on him. She also acts as a foil to Schierke, being a young magically-inclined girl with feelings for the leader of their team, but while Guts treats Schierke as a friend and surrogate daughter, Griffith merely sees Sonia as a means to an end.

Mule Wolflame

Voiced by: Mitsuki Saiga (Japanese, 2016 anime)

An adolescent Midland noble,  ran into Sonia after his group of soldiers was saved by Irvine and the new Band of the Hawk from Kushans. Sonia brought him to meet Griffith; like most people who do so, he was amazed and immediately attracted to Griffith. Ever since that day, he has been Sonia's guardian, a role in which he endures constant frustration. He runs into Isidro in Vritanis while looking for Sonia and the two ultimately became friendly rivals, creating a relationship not unlike the one Guts and Griffith once had. Sonia referred to him as the "duck knight" and offered to promote him to "wild drake" class if he bested Captain Sharkrider.

He is this Band of the Hawks' equivalent to Rickert, a child who is not fully aware of what Griffith's intentions are and is given the duties of a squire. He is also a counterpart to Isidro, being a young boy who looks up to a member of the original Band of the Hawk (Griffith for Mule and Guts for Isidro) and wants to learn from them, though unlike Mule, Isidro is far more perceptive and savvy due to his life as a thief and thus can see right through Griffith and the false utopia of Falconia.

Apostles

Snake Lord

As an Apostle, the Snake Baron transformed into a massive humanoid cobra with his human face set inside the flesh of the snake's lower jaw, with the snake's tongue jutting from his own mouth. In the manga, Guts unintentionally rescued Puck from some of the Snake Baron's men, sparing one to send the message to his master that "The Black Swordsman has come." Guts was flogged and imprisoned by the mayor's men, but escaped after Puck provided him with the keys to his cell. He then confronted the Snake Baron, crippled him, and demanded to know the location of the God Hand. When the Snake Baron could not provide an answer, Guts left the Apostle to die in a fire. In the 1997 anime series, Guts takes Snake Baron's green behelit after killing him.

The Count
In his human form, The Count appeared as an extremely obese man with a penchant for sentencing (innocent) people to death for heresy. He became an Apostle after he found his wife participating in a pagan orgy, slaughtering the pagans and then activating his behelit while preparing to commit suicide to escape the pain of her betrayal. After offering her as a sacrifice to the God Hand, he transformed into a giant tentacled slug-like Apostle with a toothy maw and his human face embedded in its 'forehead'. The Count first met Guts indirectly during the Eclipse, having hollowed out Pippin's body to use as a baiting lure before tearing the husk in half. Guts later encountered the Count again through his court physician Vargas, who sought revenge on the Apostle for the death of his family and mutilation of his body. Guts acquired the Count's behelit from Vargas, who had stolen it while escaping the castle, for his quest for vengeance against Griffith. The Count captured Vargas and has him executed, and nearly killed Guts in the battle that followed. However, a grievously injured Guts managed to outwit and mortally wound him, severing his head after blowing off part of his face with his cannon. The Count's behelit activated while soaked in his blood, however, sending them to realm of the God Hand. The God Hand offered the Count new life in return for sacrificing his daughter Theresia. But the Count hesitated to give up his daughter, the one person he truly loved, and was dragged into the Abyss by a horde of tormented souls, including a vengeful Vargas, after his body expired. The Count's grey behelit remains on Gut's person for the duration of the storyline.

Wyald
 (Japanese, Berserk and the Band of the Hawk)

 was the sadistic leader of the Black Dog Knights, a battalion most feared in the Midland as it is composed of criminals. His apostle form was a massive primate-like creature. Wyald was charged by the King of Midland to hunt down Griffith and his rescuers, the Band of the Hawk. Badly injured by Guts, he believed that his death could be averted if Griffith could be persuaded to use the Crimson Behelit to summon the God Hand; however, the king's torturer had taken it and thrown it away. Soon after, Wyald is killed by Zodd, and it is subsequently revealed he was a frail old man before he became an apostle. Due to explicit content, Wyald and the Black Dogs do not appear in the 1997 anime or the movies, though some of his lines are given to a human character who leads an attack on Griffith's rescue team and Corkus' relief corps.

Rosine
 was a young female apostle who sacrificed her parents to obtain the form of a female elf with the wings and antennae of a Luna moth, as well as a small pair of moth-like limbs near her hips and a 'helmet' similar to the head of a Luna moth. Her motivation for doing so was the legend of a child named Peekaf who believed himself an Elf and in doing so lost his human parents. She referred to herself as the Queen of the Elves and her true form is a monstrous female Luna moth. Rosine is first seen by Rickert, who spots her hovering over the middle of a lake before the camp is attacked by other apostles, and she is seen standing apart from the horde as they devour the wounded Hawks and beckoning at her fellows to attack Rickert.

Dwelling in the Misty Valley, Rosine terrorized a nearby village, sending an army of pseudo-apostles familiars disguised as elves to eat the town's livestock and people, as well as capturing children for her to transform into new servants. Guts, Puck, and Rosine's former friend Jill travelled to the Misty Valley to confront Rosine, who offered to make Jill an elf apostle. Jill was tempted by the promise of flight, but was uneasy with the warlike ways of Rosine's familiars killing each other for fun. Guts found and destroyed the elf demon cocoons while setting the Misty Valley on fire, forcing an enraged Rosine to battle him until she was so badly injured that she could no longer fight. As Guts was about to deliver a killing blow, Jill shielded Rosine with her body. It did nothing to stop Guts, but before he could act, Jill's father arrived and shot him with an arrow. Guts was then attacked by the Holy Iron Chain Knights, led by Farnese. Mortally wounded, Rosine finally understood the moral of Peekaf's fable and in her delirium attempted to return home to her parents but ultimately succumbed to her injuries and fell from the sky to her death. In some translations, she is referred to as Roshinu.

The Egg of the Perfect World

A deformed egg-shaped apostle with no name or knowledge of who he is, Nobody lived the life of an outcast by feeding on the refuse at the base of the Tower of Conviction while curious of people. Shunned by the tower refugees when they first see him, Nobody dug a deep pit into the earth to hide himself from the world that the refugees used as a dumping hole for their dead. But when Nobody used a brown Behelit while being crushed by the corpses piling on him, he appears before the God Hand as they revealed the nature of the world to him. Nobody offers his own existence and St. Albion for the chance to purify the world for salvation. During the conviction arc, the Egg used his powers to turn several people around the tower into pseudo-apostles (including Father Mozgus and his torturers) before revealing himself to one of the camp prostitutes so that at least one person would know that he existed. As the moment of the ceremony draws near, the Egg found Guts' deformed Child near death from using its power to save Casca. Out of pity while knowing they both would die soon, the latter serving as Griffith's host body, the Egg swallowed the baby before later "hatching" Griffith once the Incarnation Ceremony had run its course.

Emperor Ganishka
  (Japanese, Berserk and the Band of the Hawk)

 is the sorcerer-king of Kushan Empire. As the first born son of the previous king, Ganishka was the heir to the throne despite his mother favoring his younger brother. His mother eventually attempted to poison him to put his brother on the throne, though he barely managed to survive. Ganishka, angry and vengeful, responded by killing his brother. This drove his mother insane with grief and eventually caused her to commit suicide, and he ascended the throne after his father's death from a wartime accident. Believing fear to be the best method for conquering others, Ganishka established himself as a heinous tyrant. After nearly dying at the hands of his son, Ganishka became an Apostle with the Behelit donated to him by Daiba, offering said son as payment to the God Hand as revenge. In his Apostle form, reaching a greater depth in the Astral Realm than the others, Ganishka can manipulate water and air to manifest a fog-based construct with only a few weaknesses and the ability to hurl lightning at his enemies. Unlike the other Apostles, Ganishka did not see Griffith as his leader upon the God Hand's arrival to the physical world and acted on his own whims to restore the Kushan Empire to its former glory. This process involved Ganishka having Daiba create a man-made Behelit by sewing the corpses of dead Apostles together to create his army of Daka and animals infused with spirits to conquer Midland and the rest of the world.

After turning the Midland capital of Wyndham into a literal hell, Ganishka next turned his attention to the Holy See's western stronghold of Vrittanis with Griffith as the church's champion. Ganishka agreed to have his final battle with Griffith in Wyndham, using his man-made Behelit in a ritual that takes the life force of those caught in it, namely his patrol men and beasts, to transform himself into a mountainous monstrosity of godlike power that Daiba called "Shiva". However, while gradually losing his mind in his state, Ganishka was destroyed when Griffith redirected the Skull Knight's attack with the Sword of Resonance at him. Because Ganishka transcended his humanity twice, the sword's dimensional properties caused his death to trigger the "World Transformation" that heralded the coming of Fantasia, with his corpse crystallized into a giant tree on the land Falconia is built.

The Royal Court of Midland

The King of Midland

The elderly ruler of Midland who had been fighting a century long war with the neighboring empire of Tudor. Burdened by the demands and responsibilities of his throne, the King's only comfort was his daughter Charlotte whom to him was the sole source of warmth in his existence. Due to the Band of the Hawk's victories on the battlefield, the King supported Griffith despite his common heritage and the disapproval of the nobility and eventually bestowed upon him command over all of Midland's armies. But upon learning that Griffith slept with Charlotte, the king became enraged and ordered Griffith be imprisoned and tortured while labeling the Band of the Hawk as outlaws. Combined with his attempt to rape Charlotte to regain her comfort, completely losing her as a consequence while using hired Bakiraka and the Black Dog Knights to kill Griffith after he was freed by his group, the king gradually loses his mind while his health deteriorates to the point of aging terribly. A few years after the eclipse, the King is bedridden and dying as his pleas for Charlotte to see him are refused. In the King's final moments, he sees a vision of Griffith returning to claim Charlotte and realizes that he supported Griffith to have someone to take his place and free him from the cold loneliness of the throne.

Charlotte

Formerly the princess of Midland,  had been in love with Griffith almost at first sight. After Guts defeated Griffith in their duel, the latter, psychologically damaged, seduced Charlotte and was imprisoned and tortured for a year as a result. During that time, she continued to pine for him, and was the one who provided the route for the Hawks to rescue him from prison. In the manga, Charlotte accompanied the rescue party with her maid Anna, but was poisoned by a dart from one of the Bakiraka and was brought back to the king. In the anime, she simply provided the information, and did not accompany the rescue party in person. Two years after the Eclipse, Midland was conquered by the Kushans and she was taken prisoner by Ganishka to be his wife. While in captivity, Charlotte spent her time making embroidery portraits of Griffith, dreaming of his return. Soon after the events at Albion, Griffith did return for her and used Zodd to fly her and Anna out of captivity. She is currently residing in Falconia with the new Band of the Hawk alongside Griffith. She declared them to be Midland's Regular Army after their resounding victory against the Kushans in Vritannis, and has so far maintained her innocent nature throughout the series. Sonia, jealous of her betrothal to Griffith, once referred to her as the "Queen of the Ducks".

Julius

 was the brother of the king and the leader of the White Dragon Knights. He resented the rise of Griffith and the Band of the Hawk in the favor of the king, especially given Griffith's common heritage. As a result, he plotted with Minister Foss to kill Griffith by arranging for a stray arrow to be fired during a hunt. The plan went awry when the arrow struck Griffith's Crimson Behelit and the king concluded that the attack was meant for Princess Charlotte, who was accompanying Griffith. In retaliation, Griffith sent Guts to assassinate Julius. Guts successfully completed his task, but as he was escaping, Julius' young son Adonis discovered him, forcing Guts to kill the boy before fleeing into the sewers.

The Queen of Midland

The queen was Charlotte's step mother. Her disapproval of Charlotte's interest in Griffith turned into hatred towards him for plotting the death of her secret lover Julius. She supported a plan conceived by Minister Foss to poison Griffith's wine at a royal party. However, due to the manipulations of Griffith, the minister betrayed her and used a nonlethal drug to make Griffith only appear dead. As the queen and a group of co-conspirators celebrated Griffith's death at the top of a tower, Foss suddenly left the gathering and silently locked the door. The queen and the others began to panic after discovering that the tower had been set on fire. Glancing out a window, she beheld Griffith alive and well, to her horror. The queen furiously declared that Griffith, a commoner, could not be allowed to kill royalty. Griffith replied that on the battlefield, heritage has no meaning, only who is defeated. She dies after being crushed by flaming debris.

Minister Foss

 is a master of court intrigue. He conceived of plots with both Julius and the queen to kill Griffith. However, after the death of Julius, Griffith discovered Foss' involvement with the queen because he detected a hint of fear in the look of the minister's eyes. Griffith kidnapped Foss' daughter Elise in order to ensure the minister's cooperation. After Foss helped Griffith end the queen's life, Griffith returned the minister's daughter to him, declaring that there should be no more enmity between them. After the Eclipse, Foss predicted that the visions of the White Hawk signify that Griffith will return. More recently, he has been seen in the company of Laban, discussing Griffith's return and upcoming confrontation with Ganishka.

Laban

 was an early supporter of Griffith. He agreed with the king that Griffith should be judged on battlefield merit. After the Eclipse, he traveled about assisting victims of the plague. He is now assisting Griffith in his battle against Ganishka. Most recently, he led a rescue of a group of women who had been held prisoner by the emperor. His name is translated as Raban in the anime.

Owen

 believed that he could advance in the court by aligning himself with Griffith. On the eve of the king's death, Owen showed great concern about Charlotte's well-being, but he was denied permission to see her. At Vritanis, only Owen recognized Guts as the leader of the Hawk's Raiders. When Charlotte declared that the new Band of the Hawk was to be Midland's regular army, and Griffith Midland's general, Owen supported her, declaring to the other nobles that Griffith had a right to the position as Midland's former hero during the war with Tudor, and that Charlotte was well informed about Griffith's tactical ability.

Other characters

Gambino

Guts' adoptive father, and leader of a mercenary band,  trained Guts to be a mercenary like himself and even gave Guts his first scar (across his nose) when he became insane. Gambino was later hit by a cannon blast in battle and lost his leg and the ability to fight. This incensed his anger towards Guts even further, as he also blamed Guts for the death of his lover, Sys. Gambino became drunk one night and tried to kill Guts in a fit of rage, only to be killed by Guts with his own sword. He constantly haunts Guts during his early years before the massacre of the original Band of Hawk.

The Skull Knight
 (Japanese, video game), Akio Ohtsuka (Japanese, movies & 2016 anime), Jamieson Price (English, movies & 2016 anime)

The  is one of the most mysterious and prolific characters introduced in Berserk. He is a towering warrior dressed in full armor who rides a massive, ghostly black horse, and whose ornaments, especially his helmet (or actual head), are shaped as parts of a human skeleton. A noble figure in spite of his ominous appearance, he serves as a strong adversary to the God Hand and its acolytes. He can kill Apostles with ease, and often consumes their Behelits afterwards. He is also capable of besting Zodd the Immortal in combat, though with great difficulty, and the latter sees him as a long-time rival. He wields a powerful sword that, when stuck down his throat, becomes coated with Behelits and capable of slashing rifts through reality itself, thus allowing the Skull Knight to move freely around the world or even between different dimensions. This enigmatic knight saved Guts in more than one occasion such as the Eclipse or from Slan, never explaining his reasons but simply declaring that the Struggler (the way he calls Guts) has to keep following his fate. The Skull Knight is also the previous wearer of the Berserker Armor, and knew the witch Flora. During Griffith's final battle with Ganishka's forces, the Skull Knight's attempt on Griffith's life with his sword was diverted to the writhing body of the Kushan Emperor. It is heavily speculated that, during his life as a mortal, the Skull Knight was in fact Supreme King Gaiseric, a warlord notorious for his skull-shaped helmet. According to the legends, Gaiseric unified the continent and ruled an empire from what would become Midland before his ambitions prompted a holy man into invoking God's wrath by sending his angels (implied to be God Hand) to punish him.

Silat

 is a highly skilled and agile Kushan fighter first encountered by Guts in the Golden Age arc. He wields exotic weapons including chakrams, Katars (कटार) and urumi. His combat style is similar to kalaripayat, though Guts has referred to him as a circus performer due to Silat's exotic appearance, acrobatics and his almost theatrical tendency to call out his attacks. Silat and Guts first met prior to the Eclipse in a fight tournament at a carnival to determine who would lead a band of mercenaries to finish off a battered and demoralized Band of the Hawk. When a victorious Guts refused to claim the prize, Silat, as runner-up, took on the job, which led to his second defeat. Years later, it was revealed that Silat was the leader of the Bākiraka clan, and that he was working under Emperor Ganishka in order to restore his people to their rightful place. To do this, he continually tried to find and capture Griffith, only to come up unsuccessful. But after he learned that Ganishka was an apostle who had been behind the cruel slaughter of women for his demoniac reinforcements, Silat started to question his sworn allegiance. A Kushan engineer under Griffith named Jaris offered Silat a position in the Band of the Hawk, but Silat decides not to align himself with another demon ruler and instead watch from the shadows until deciding to spirit Rickert from Falconia.

His clan almost all utilize the same style of acrobatics and precision attacks with exotic weapons, such as toothed-swords, bladed discs, and the like, and defeat Midland infantry with ease, only meeting their match (understandably) against foes such as Guts, or, on one occasion, Nosferatu Zodd. Among the clan, however, are four men known as Tapasa who fight in a dramatically different style more suiting their towering frames and nubs of swollen bone near their big toes, index fingers, knees, and elbows (the striking points in their attacks). They are shown not only to be blindingly fast, but also capable of smashing through bone and steel armor alike with their strikes, much of which resembles the real-world Hung Ga fighting style, which emphasizes low stances and powerful hand strikes, though they use their legs as well. Two of them are present at the time when Silat is shown the Apostle-construct that creates the Kushan monsters, but a total of four have been shown at a single time. None have ever been shown killed in combat.

Tudor
The  is the opposition to Midland during the Hundred Year War having since set a foothold by taking the Fortress of Doldrey which was put under the command of governor Gennon near the war's end. When power vacuum occurred after the ruler of Tudor died, Griffith exploited the now weakened status of the invading military by using a masterful strategy to reclaim Doldrey for Midland while Tudor's remaining forces retreat back to their homeland. Tudor is also an antagonistic force in the spin-off novel , attempting to conquer the Grand Duchy of Grant on the grounds of spreading the Holy See Faith despite their numerous atrocities.

Adon Coborlwitz

, a principal opponent of the original Band of the Hawk during the Hundred Year War, is the misogynistic commander of Tudor's . He regularly bragged about special attacks and defenses that he called "Coborlwitz family secrets", such as "Bakuretsu Funsai", a 300-year-old fleeing technique, and "Ressha Jinrai", a 1000-year-old crossbow sneak attack. In the 1997 anime, Adon had additional dealings with the Hawks in first an attempt to lure Griffith within range of a hidden explosive cache and losing a castle under his command when Guts first joined the Hawks. First seen in the story where he overpowers a weakened Casca on a cliff ledge while goading her with sexist comments, Adon's face got mangled by Guts when he came to her defense. Though Guts and Casca fall off into the river below after he shot the former in his attempt to save the latter, a revenge-driven Adon tracks them down with about a hundred of his men, including his much bigger and stronger little brother Samson Coborlwitz. But it ended with his men all killed by Guts, who earn the nickname "The Hundred Man Slayer", while Casca fled to reach their comrades. While the manga has Adon demoted by Boscogn and "punished" to remain in Doldrey using the Hawks' siege as a last line of defense, the movies portrayed Adon to be captured by the Hawks and used by Casca's group as a means to infiltrate Doldrey before turning on them. Overpowered by a fully abled Casca, Adon attempted to use dishonest tactics to guard her off guard for a kill before she ultimately kills him.

Boscogn

Considered the most powerful Tudor general with an intolerance towards irresponsibility and cowardice, he is first seen confronting Adon about the fiasco in which he lost a hundred men to Guts. In battle he wields a long-hafted berdiche, with which he is capable of cutting men in half. Placed under the authority of Lord Gennon, Boscone treats the Governor with polite deference but is privately disgusted by Gennon's sexual tastes towards youthful men and frustrated by his master's ill-advised interference with strategy. While he showed great skill as a tactician and as a warrior, during the battle of Doldrey, he was out-ranked by Gennon and consequently could not command the battlefield according to his tactics which included killing Griffith whom Gennon wanted alive. Boscogn confronts Guts in a climactic duel where he dismounted the Hundred Man Slayer and broke his sword, only to end up being decapitated along with his steed in one stroke after Guts acquired a new blade secretly provided by Zodd. Boscogn's death and the loss at Doldrey forces the station Tudor army to retreat, making the end of Midland's war with Tudor.

General Abecassis
The antagonist of the spin-off novel  and overseer of Tudor's conquest of the Grand Duchy of Grant under the cover of spreading the Holy See Faith. He based himself in Fort Chester where he oversaw Grunbeld's training as attempted to break his spirit by arranging for him and his friends to be mauled by a tiger. Years after Grunbeld and his friends escaped his custody, Abecassis wins over the Grantian noble Haakon to hand the duchy to Tudor while eliminating Grunbeld and his Flame Dragon Knights. But the attempt on Grunbeld's life caused the events that led to his transition onto an Apostle, with Abecassis dying an agonizing death.

Guts and Casca's Child
A nameless entity who was conceived by Guts and Casca shortly before the eclipse, corrupted by the semen of Griffith when he raped Casca after his ascension as Femto. This resulted in the child being born prematurely as a rat-sized disfigured fetal abomination that appears at night, acting on instinct to be with his parents as he followed Guts for two years before traveling by Casca's side as her protector. The Child displays supernatural abilities that included creating barriers, but their use  drained the Child of his life force by the time Egg of the Perfect World swallowed the child so neither of them would die alone. As a result of the Egg's actions, the Child became the vessel of Griffith's new physical body.

But the Child's presence still lingers in first compelling Griffith to protect Casca during Guts's fight with Zodd. It would later be revealed that Child is able to regain use of his body on the night of a full moon, travelling to wherever Guts and Casca are in the form of a raven-haired youth. During the nights he is able to appear, the Child helps Guts and his group during their journey to Elfhelm.

Jill
Jill came from a village terrorized by Misty Valley demons the villagers identified as elves. Her father was drunken and abusive to her and her mother. Guts and Puck rescued her from a man who was about to try out an old sacrifice ritual on her. She took them to her village, where the villagers became alarmed by the appearance of Puck. Jill met up with Guts and Puck after they fled and told them the elves eat livestock and people and carry away children. After the elves attack the village and Guts uses a village boy to lure them into a trap, Jill identifies their leader as her childhood friend, Rosine. When the villagers turn on Guts again, he pretends to kidnap Jill, allowing him to leave peacefully. Jill and Guts set forth separately for the Valley, but Jill arrives first. Rosine takes Jill for a flight and offers to make her an especially powerful elf, but Jill refuses due to the reckless savagery the elves exhibit. When Guts arrives, he burns Rosine's elf cocoons, hunts down the elves, and fights Rosine until she falls to the ground. When Guts tries to deliver the killing blow, Jill shields Rosine. Jill's father arrives, along with the Holy Iron Chain Knights, and Guts is driven away. Jill catches up to Guts, and asks him to take her with him. Guts tells her to go back to her father because the danger is too great. Puck gives Jill a stinging bramble she can use to keep her father in check as a parting gift.

Mozgus

 was the golem-faced fanatical inquisitor of the Holy See whose insignia is a set of Breaking wheels. He was an exceptionally zealous but equally cruel individual who tortured and often brutally executed large numbers of supposed heretics, usually after forcing them to "confess". While Mozgus had considered everyone to be a sinner, the only exceptions he saw would be his followers, who were unrepentant and sometimes fiendish social pariahs whose reason to learn the act of torture was to repay Mozgus for his sympathy. During the plague in Midland, with the Holy Iron Chain Knights having been assigned the task of escorting him, Mozgus was sent to St. Albion when news had reached the Holy See of pagans in the holy city. After Casca was captured, being revered by the pagans, Mozgus deemed her as a witch and intended to burn her at the stake. But when her presence in the torture chamber caused the spirits of the countless torture victims to manifest in the blood, Mozgus considered the act to be a divine test while taking his transformation by the Egg of the Perfect World into a feather-covered Pseudo-Apostle, believing god had chosen him. After his transformed aides are killed, and with his flames shielding the people from the corpse-possessed spirits, Mozgus battles Guts in a fight that ends with his death. Ironically, Jerome noted afterwards that it made him more like a guardian angel than ever before, with the flames from Mozgus's dead body providing the surviving refugees with protection from the flesh-consuming dead before the Incarnation Ritual would commence.

Luca

 is the leader of a band of prostitutes at Albion. She was introduced trying to convince a Holy See official of Casca's guiltlessness in relation to one of Mozgus's victims, using a callous facade to do so. However, she was revealed shortly after to be disgusted with their cruelty (although there is an alternative translation of the scene which paints her in a more heartless light). Luca then took in the wayward Casca, calling the mute former Hawk commander Elaine. When Jerome, a customer and love interest of sorts, gave her a necklace of pearls, she divided them evenly among her girls, believing that they could only survive the hysteria of the heretic hunts by eliminating any cause for jealousy. She covered Casca's face in bandages as a pretense that Casca had contracted syphilis. When the weak-willed prostitute Nina visited the nearby goat worshiping cult and threatened to turn her over to the worshipers, Luca smacked and then spanked the blond haired girl, causing her to submit. When Pepe, one of her prostitutes, was accused of heresy, Luca came to her defense. Luca and Pepe were saved from arrest with the timely appearance of Guts. When Guts discovered that Luca had seen Casca, Luca attempted to reunite him with Casca, but she could not since Nina had taken the mute girl to the cult. When Casca and Nina were taken to Mozgus, Luca bribed a guard to allow her to enter the monastery. While Guts was looking for Casca, Luca released Nina from her imprisonment. After Isidro challenged Mozgus to release Casca, one of the priest's torturers attacked, causing Luca to fall. Nina grabbed Luca and tried to hold her, but Luca let go. Luca was spared injury because she was caught by the Skull Knight. She then met the Egg of the Perfect World, who explained his purpose to her. When Albion was being overrun by the dead, Luca hid Nina in a barrel and herself in a well to survive the ordeal. Some time after, Luca ends up owning an inn in Falconia.

Flora

 is Schierke's mistress, who taught her in the arts of magic and Od. In addition to being a powerful witch of indeterminate age, she is an old friend of the Skull Knight, whom she sees as "still having a human heart." This would imply that Flora knew the Skull Knight before he took on his current ghoulish form. Prior to her living in the woods outside Enoch village, she wandered the land, helping people with her magic until the Holy See's influence drove her into reclusion. During their journey to the sea, Guts and his party were recruited by Flora to aide in the extermination of a troll infestation that threatened the nearby villages and forest. In exchange, she provides them with several magical items as well as special tattoos for Guts and Casca which dampen the signal transmitted by the brand of sacrifice. She dies when Griffith sends apostles to hunt down anyone powerful enough to oppose him, her spirit appearing a final time before Schierke as she possessed the flames the Apostles had lit to consume her and her home to create a barricade between them and Guts's party, thereby allowing them to escape.

Federico de Vandimion

 is the head of the illustrious Vandimion family, the wealthiest noble clan in Berserk. He is father to Farnese, Serpico, Manifico, Georgio and Politiano. Initially painted as a distant man, he was often working hard to ensure his vast fortune was secure, leaving no time to raise Farnese properly. In truth, he was actually frightened of his unpredictable daughter, as revealed by his wife to Farnese. His neglectful behavior towards his family is likewise returned to him, with the exception of Farnese, who asked Guts to protect her family when Kushan beasts invaded a ball to massacre the attending nobility. Years ago he had an affair, the result of which is none other than Serpico: he granted the latter a noble title in cold exchange for his silence on the matter of their relation.

Captain Bonebeard

 is the commander of a pirate ship called the Captain Sharkrider. The stereotypical pirate captain, he attempted to go legit by going into the slave trade business with Kushan children, putting him at odds with Schierke, who had decided to free them. Isidro, who was trying to keep the spirited young witch from being burned at the stake, joined her crusade. Sonia admired her effort and joined her as well, bringing her guard Mule along. Mule attempted to fight the captain but was ill-suited for fighting on the swaying boat. The nimble Isidro fared much better and the captain offered to let the boy thief serve on his ship. Azan, asleep on the boat, was awakened and joined in the melee. Ultimately, the whole group of them forced Bonebeard to give up his slaves.

Once Roderick's ship was at sea, Bonebeard ordered an attack on the warship, ignorant that his enemy was much more than he could handle. Hopelessly out-gunned, Bonebeard was forced to retreat, his ship maimed almost to the point of sinking. In his lack of luck, after the World Transformation occurred, Bonebeard is devoured by the Sea God as he, his crew, and their ship become extensions of the ancient creature. Bonebeard serves as the Sea God's primary helper until the creature is killed by Guts.

Humorously, his ship's name is made reality by the figurehead of his ship: a skeleton pirate captain riding a shark. Also, it's revealed by Bonebeard himself that he became an emotional wreck following his defeat at the docks by Azan and Schierke, having failed to become a legitimate businessman (though via slave trading), he found that he'd lost his touch with piracy, as well. Guts' party, particularly Isidro, are disgusted by how pathetic Bonebeard appears despite his ghoulish form, as he is reduced to hiding behind one of the gunwales of his ship and gnawing on a banister.

Daiba
 was Ganishka's loyal sorcerer chief and advisor who desired a powerful kingdom under the rule of magic. He was formerly an ascetic who had given Ganishka the behelit that would make him an Apostle. Daiba also created for Ganishka the man-made behelit used to breed their army of monsters. He challenged Guts' group by conjuring a storm and summoning monstrous beasts from the seas, but even through his greatest sorceries, which included summoning tornadoes and a gigantic water spirit, he was defeated by the combined efforts of Guts and Schierke. Daiba was last seen riding atop a pterodactyl-like creature after Ganishka transformed into an entity he believed to be the deity Shiva, having used his magic to protect himself from the ritual. After Ganishka's death and the world's descent into fantastical chaos, Daiba goes into hiding in Falconia as a stable hand in Luca's inn. He ends up saving Erica from Rakshas and later provided Rickert and Silat assistance in escaping from Falconia.

Video game characters

Rita

 is a travelling performer skilled in throwing knives and juggling. Her accomplice, Job was infected with Mandragora and her performing days were cut short when Guts killed him. Reluctantly at first, she eventually helps Guts out throughout the Chapter. She appears on the Dreamcast game version of Berserk.

Balzac

 is the baron of a town who was once a considerate ruler, but the pressure of caring for his subjects while researching on Mandragorans to his ailing wife Annette turned him into a dictator. When Guts came to his town, Balzac plotted to use him to acquire the Mandragora Heart in hopes it would restore her mind. However, complications foiled Balzac's plan as he attempted to kill Guts as a Mandragoran. But fatally wounded, his destined behelit unknowingly brought to him by Rita, Balzac sacrifices Anette to be reborn a chimera-like Apostle before Guts kills him for good.

Eriza

 is a nun working with the Mandragoras, having become a Mandragoran yet retaining her will. Long ago, a simple-minded pleasant boy named Niko who visited her cathedral regularly died one winter's night. From Niko's body, a Mandragora grew and Eriza resolved to protect it while it spread across her village. Balzac attempted to take the Mandragora's Heart, but only escaped with a fragment for his research before requesting Guts to get the rest. Though Eriza pleas with Guts to leave peacefully, she is forced to fight him when he finds the Mandragora tree and cuts out its heart. Eriza refuses to relinquish the heart, which is Niko's remains, and attempts to flee before finding the Mandragoran villagers being massacred by Balzac's men. In desperation, Eriza chooses to take her own life rather than hand Niko over as she runs back into the burning church. While doing so she drops a pendant she made with an item that she found with the boy's body: a behelit that eventually reaches Balzac as part of his fate.

Charles

, appearing in the Berserk: Millennium Falcon Hen Seima Senki no Shō 2004 game, is a child of noble birth who lost his parents and manor home in a fire. Charles ended up an apostle with illusionary powers at the cost of his sister, appearing to have blocked out the memory of his sister's death and created a phantom of her. Charles also recreated his home where he remained in solitude before Guts intruded, the Apostle conjuring phantoms of the deceased members of the Band of the Hawk to haunt Guts before being killed off by the swordsman.

References

External links
  
  
 

Berserk (manga)
Berserk